Oedesis is a genus of beetles in the family Carabidae, containing the following species:

 Oedesis caucasicus (Dejean, 1831)
 Oedesis cyprius Wrase, 1999
 Oedesis kryzhanovskii Wrase, 1999
 Oedesis obscurior (Pic, 1911)
 Oedesis palaestinus (Piochard de a Brulerie, 1873)
 Oedesis tomentosus (Dejean, 1831)
 Oedesis villosulus (Reiche, 1859)

References

Harpalinae